Masuk Mia Jony, also spelled as Masuk Miah Zoni, is a Bangladeshi footballer who plays as a midfielder. He currently plays for Bangladesh Premier League side Bashundhara Kings.

International Goals

U20
Scores and results list Bangladesh's goal tally first.

Club
Dhaka Mohammedan

References

Living people
1998 births
Bangladeshi footballers
Bangladesh international footballers
Bangladesh youth international footballers
Association football midfielders
Footballers at the 2018 Asian Games
Bashundhara Kings players
Asian Games competitors for Bangladesh
People from Moulvibazar District